Newark Charter School (NCS) is a public charter school located in Newark, Delaware, that serves children from kindergarten to twelfth grade using the Core Knowledge curriculum. 3,005 students were enrolled in the school for the 2022–23 school year. It has two campuses, the Greg R. Meece Campus with three buildings for elementary (K-2), intermediate (3-5), and junior high (6-8) and the McIntire Drive Campus with the senior high school (9-12).

History
Newark Charter School's charter was approved by the Delaware State Board of Education in April 2000 and the middle school opened in September 2001. Shortly after the school opened, their students voted "the Patriot" as their mascot after the September 11 attacks and the school address was changed to 2001 Patriot Way. The charter was renewed in June 2004. An elementary school was opened in August 2007 and the charter was renewed for a second time in January 2010.

In April 2012, the Delaware state board of education voted unanimously to allow the addition of a high school, which made Newark Charter the state's first K-12 charter school.  Newark Charter High School is located in the former Lear Corporation factory, which made car seats for the now closed Chrysler Newark Assembly plant.  There were openings for 162 ninth graders in fall 2013, with another grade added each year.  The first graduation took place in 2017 with a total of 154 students graduating.  In 2020, the first students to complete the full K-12 program received diplomas. As of May 2022, 950 students have graduated from Newark Charter High School.

In 2019, the school purchased the Delaware Freezer warehouse behind the Patriot Way campus to construct a new junior high school.  In March 2021, the groundbreaking ceremony for the new building took place with construction continuing through the 2021-2022 school year.  The new Junior High will open in time for the 2022-2023 school year and a reorganization in the existing buildings followed suit.  The Elementary school shifted from K-3 to K-2, the Intermediate school shifted from 4-6 to 3-5, and the McIntire Drive campus shifted from 7-12 to 9-12.  To fund the construction, 600 additional seats were added in grades k-9 (50 per grade level).

In addition to the new Middle School, construction of a Commons Building also took place connecting the Elementary and Intermediate Schools in 2021.  Opening in August 2021, this building features new administrative offices along with a bus port, shared kitchen, classrooms, a new art room, and a larger library.  The final part of the expansion will be a new performing arts center and athletic complex at the McIntire Drive campus that will be completed in 2023.  A new 600-seat auditorium, an auxiliary gym, a weight room, improved locker room facilities, and a new lighted athletic complex featuring a turf field and track are currently planned.

Athletics
The school joined the Diamond State Athletic Conference in the 2015–2016 school year.

The Newark Charter Unified Flag Football team won back to back state championships in 2016 and 2017.

The Newark Charter Girls Swim Team has won the DIAA Division II championship in 2018 and 2019.

School awards
The school was named a National Blue Ribbon School by the United States Department of Education in 2010, and in 2016 in the "Exemplary High Performing Schools" performance category.

The various campuses have been recognized by U.S. News & World Report in their annual "best schools" ranking.  The Elementary grades (K-5) and Middle School grades (6-8) were both ranked #1 in the state in the most recent ranking in 2021. The High School was ranked as the #2 best High School in Delaware in 2022, 2021 and 2020.  The highest national ranking for the High School was 191st in 2021 and its highest charter ranking was 49th in 2021.  National ranks are not given for Elementary or Middle School grade levels by U.S. News & World Report.

The school was named a Top Workplace in Delaware by The News Journal in 2011, 2012, 2014, 2015, and 2016.

The school was selected by the College Board in 2015 to implement their AP Capstone Program.

Student recognition
One student has participated in the Scripps National Spelling Bee after winning the state title for Delaware.  She finished 47th in the competition in 2016.

Two students have participated three times at the National Geography Bee after winning the state title for Delaware.  Participating in 2011, 2015, and 2017, the highest finish for an NCS student at the bee was tied for 7th in 2017 (he participated in the finals that aired on television).

Since 2017, the High School has had 17 semi-finalists and five winners of the National Merit Scholarship Program.

Since 2018, the High School has had four students selected as part of the Presidential Scholars Program and 10 semi-finalists.

References

External links

Schools in New Castle County, Delaware
Educational institutions established in 2001
2001 establishments in Delaware
Buildings and structures in Newark, Delaware
Charter K-12 schools in Delaware